Bronisław Waruś is a Polish former slalom canoeist who competed from the late 1950s to the mid-1960s. He won a silver medal in the folding K-1 team event at the 1963 ICF Canoe Slalom World Championships in Spittal.

References

Polish male canoeists
Possibly living people
Year of birth missing (living people)
Place of birth missing (living people)
Medalists at the ICF Canoe Slalom World Championships